Garm Bit may refer to:
 Garm Bit-e Bala
 Garm Bit-e Pain